Union Lookout is a lookout tower located within Trail of Tears State Forest in Union County, Illinois, United States. The Civilian Conservation Corps built the tower circa 1934 as part of a network of fire lookout towers in Shawnee National Forest; the fire towers were one of many CCC conservation projects in the forest, which also included planting trees, constructing bridges and trails, and preventing erosion. The tower was used through the 1960s, by which time airplanes had largely replaced towers as a means of detecting fires; it is now the only remaining lookout tower in the forest. On February 5, 2003, Union Lookout was added to the National Register of Historic Places.

See also
Hickory Ridge Fire Tower in Indiana's Hoosier National Forest

References

Government buildings on the National Register of Historic Places in Illinois
Towers completed in 1934
Buildings and structures in Union County, Illinois
Fire lookout towers in Illinois
Fire lookout towers on the National Register of Historic Places
Shawnee National Forest
Civilian Conservation Corps in Illinois
National Register of Historic Places in Union County, Illinois
1934 establishments in Illinois